Hans Theodor Hugo von Hallwyl (28 December 1835 – 16 June 1909) was a Swiss politician, who headed the Conseil d'Etat of the Aargau canton from 1866 to 1875.

Bibliography
Historische Gesellschaft des Kantons Aargau (ed.s): Biographisches Lexikon des Kantons Aargau 1803–1957. In: Argovia. Band 68/69, Verlag Sauerländer, Aarau 1958, S. 305–306.

19th-century Swiss politicians
1835 births
1909 deaths
People from Überlingen